Zaleodes is a monotypic moth genus of the family Noctuidae. Its only species, Zaleodes xylochroa, is found in Peru. Both the genus and the species were first described by George Hampson in 1926.

References

Catocalinae
Monotypic moth genera